David M. Torrisi (born September 18, 1968 in Methuen, Massachusetts) is an American attorney and politician who represented the 14th Essex district in the Massachusetts House of Representatives.

Torrisi graduated from  the University of Vermont in 1990 and found work as a child care counselor. He later served as an aide to Congressman Marty Meehan.

From 1996 to 1999, Torrisi served as a member of the North Andover Board of Selectmen. In 1998 he defeated incumbent Donna Cuomo in the general election.

On September 6, 2012, Torrisi was defeated in the Democratic primary by Diana DiZoglio. He lost every community in his district except North Andover.

References

1968 births
Democratic Party members of the Massachusetts House of Representatives
People from Methuen, Massachusetts
University of Vermont alumni
Suffolk University Law School alumni
Living people